Víctor Ruiz may refer to:

Víctor Ruiz (Mexican footballer) (born 1969)
Víctor Ruiz (footballer, born 1989), Spanish footballer
Víctor Ruiz (footballer, born 1993), Spanish footballer
Víctor Ruiz (weightlifter) (born 1957), Mexican Olympic weightlifter